Sada Nahimana (born 21 April 2001) is a Burundian tennis player.

She has a career-high singles ranking of world No. 251, reached on 3 October 2022. She also has a best junior ranking of 12, achieved on 15 July 2019.

Nahimana made her WTA Tour main-draw debut at the 2018 Rabat Grand Prix in the doubles tournament, partnering Egyptian Sandra Samir.

Junior career
Junior Grand Slam results - Singles:
 Australian Open: 1R (2019)
 French Open: 2R (2018)
 Wimbledon: 2R (2018)
 US Open: 1R (2018)

Career
She defeated former top-10 player Kristina Mladenovic at the 2022 ITS Cup in Olomouc.

ITF Circuit finals

Singles: 6 (2 titles, 4 runner–ups)

Doubles: 7 (3 titles, 4 runner-ups)

ITF Junior Circuit finals

Singles: 8 (1–7)

Doubles: 11 (7–4)

References

External links
 
 

2001 births
Living people
Burundian female tennis players
Tennis players at the 2018 Summer Youth Olympics
21st-century Burundian people